This is a timeline of major events in the history of the city of Geelong, Australia.

19th century

 1802 – Lady Nelson enters Corio Bay
 1803 – Escaped convict William Buckley living in area.
 1835 – John Batman establishes base camp at Indented Head
 1838 – Geelong township surveyed, Geelong population is 545.
 1839 – First sale of Geelong town allotments
 1839 – First postal mail between Geelong and Melbourne
 1840 – First issue of the Geelong Advertiser newspaper is published
 1845 – Geelong Keys discovered at Corio Bay
 1849 – The Geelong town council is incorporated.
 1850 – Geelong is the fifth largest town in Victoria.
 1851 – Gold is found in the Mount Bunninyong district
 1851 – Geelong population is 8,000
 1853 – Geelong population is 22,000
 1857 – Victoria's first country railway from Geelong to Melbourne is built
 1859 – Thomas Austin releases 24 rabbits into the wild on his property 'Barwon Park' at Winchelsea just outside Geelong on Christmas Day, introducing the rabbit to Australia.
 1862 – Geelong to Ballarat railway opens
 1888 – First telephone exchange in Geelong opens
 1890 – Geelong Cementworks Opens

20th century

 1910 – Geelong officially becomes a city
 1912 – Electric trams begin operation in Geelong
 1912 – First automatic telephone exchange in the Southern Hemisphere opens in Geelong
 1925 – Geelong Football Club wins premiership
 1925 – Ford Motor Company plant opens at Norlane
 1925 – Retail chain Target opens first store in Geelong
 1926 – Geelong suburb Highton gets struck by tornado
 1930 – 3GL radio station opens
 1931 – Geelong Football Club wins premiership
 1937 – Geelong Football Club wins premiership
 1951 – Geelong Football Club wins premiership
 1952 – Geelong Football Club wins premiership
 1954 – Shell refinery opens at Corio
 1956 – Electric trams cease operation in Geelong
 1963 – Geelong Football Club wins premiership
 1963 – Alcoa aluminum smelter opens at Point Henry
 1983 – Ash Wednesday fires cause major damage at nearby coastal areas
 1987 – National Wool Museum opens
 1990 – First commercial FM Radio station K-Rock begins FM broadcasting
 1990 – Pyramid Building Society collapse
 1991 – HM Prison Geelong officially closes

21st century
 2001 – Geelong population is 184,332
 2002 – 23 May, Skilled Stadium hosts a visit from the Dalai Lama
 2003 – Former mayor Frank De Stefano is sentenced to 10 years imprisonment on fraud charges involving A$8.3 million
 2006 – Geelong population is 210,000 becoming the 12th largest city in Australia
 2007 – Geelong Football Club wins premiership by record margin of 119 points
 2009 – Geelong Football Club wins premiership
 2010 – Geelong Ring Road construction Complete 
 2011 – Geelong Football Club wins premiership
 2015 – Worksafe Victoria Headquarters Construction started
 2016 – Geelong population is 253,269
 2016- A giant cell storm comes through Geelong, flooding the Barwon and Moorabool rivers, along with Belmont, South Geelong, and Newtown.
 2018 – Worksafe Victoria Headquarters Construction complete
 2019 – The Mercer and Miramar Geelong construction started
 2020 - COVID-19 reaches Geelong. Total of 2,370 cases confirmed since arrival date.
 2020 - Devastating Storm hits Geelong causing Tornado in Suburb of Waurn Ponds.

Timeline of tallest buildings in Geelong:

1. The Miramar – 71 m (2019)

2. The Mercer – 64 m (2019)

3. Worksafe Headquarters Geelong – 60 m (2018)

4.  Mercure Hotel – 40 m (2008)

6. Shell Refinery – 40 m (1946)

7. Fyansford Cementworks – 30 m (1954)

See also

 History of Victoria

References

Geelong
Geelong
Geelong